(Old Polish and ) are filled doughnuts found in Polish cuisine.

Description
A pączek is a deep-fried piece of dough shaped into a flattened ball and filled with confiture or other sweet filling. Pączki are usually covered with powdered sugar, icing, glaze or bits of dried orange zest. A small amount of grain alcohol (traditionally rectified spirit) is added to the dough before cooking; as it evaporates, it prevents the absorption of oil deep into the dough. Pączki are commonly thought of as fluffy but somewhat collapsed, with a bright stripe around them; these features are seen as evidence that the dough was fried in fresh oil.

Although they look like German berliners (bismarcks in North America) or jelly doughnuts, pączki are made from especially rich dough containing eggs, fats, sugar, yeast and sometimes milk. They feature a variety of fruit and creme fillings and can be glazed, or covered with granulated or powdered sugar. Powidła (stewed plum jam) and wild rose petal jam are traditional fillings, but many others are used as well, including strawberry, Bavarian cream, blueberry, custard, raspberry, and apple.

 have been known in Poland at least since the Middle Ages. Jędrzej Kitowicz wrote that during the reign of Augustus III, under the influence of French cooks who came to Poland, pączki dough was improved so that pączki became lighter, spongier, and more resilient.

Etymology, spelling and pronunciation
The Polish word   is a diminutive of the Polish word   "bud". The latter derives from Proto-Slavic , which may have referred to anything that is round, bulging and about to burst (compare Proto-Slavic  "to swell, burst"), possibly of ultimately onomatopoeic origin. From Polish the word has been borrowed into several other Slavic languages, where the respective loanwords (or ) refer to a similar ball-shaped pastry.

English speakers typically use the plural form of the Polish word in both singular and plural.

Pączki Day

In Poland,  are eaten especially on Fat Thursday, the last Thursday prior to Ash Wednesday and the beginning of Lent. The traditional reason for making pączki was to use up all the lard, sugar, eggs and fruit in the house, because their consumption was forbidden by Christian fasting practices during the season of Lent.

In North America, particularly the large Polish communities of Chicago, Detroit, Milwaukee, and other large cities across the Midwest and Northeast, Paczki Day is celebrated annually by immigrants and locals alike. The date of this observance merges with that of pre-Lenten traditions of other immigrants (e.g., Pancake Day, Mardi Gras) on Fat Tuesday. With its sizable Polish population, Chicago celebrates the festival on both Fat Thursday and Fat Tuesday. Pączki are also often eaten on Casimir Pulaski Day. In Buffalo, Toledo, Cleveland, Detroit, Grand Rapids, St. Louis, South Bend, Louisville, and Windsor, Pączki Day is celebrated on Fat Tuesday.

The Pączki Day celebrations in some areas are even larger than many celebrations for St. Patrick's Day. In Hamtramck, Michigan, an enclave of Detroit, there is an annual Pączki Day (Shrove Tuesday) Parade, which has gained a devoted following. Throughout the Metro Detroit area, it is so widespread that many bakeries attract lines of customers for pączki on Pączki Day. In suburban Cleveland, Eastern European bakery Rudy's Strudel hosts a large indoor and outdoor Paczki Day party in conjunction with neighboring record store, The Current Year. It's called "the Mardi Gras of the Midwest".

In some areas, Pączki Day is celebrated with pączki-eating contests.

United States

These pastries have become popular in the United States as a result of Polish immigrants and marketing by the bakery industry. Sold in bakeries mainly on both Fat Tuesday and Fat Thursday throughout Detroit and Chicago, they are particularly popular in areas where there is a large concentration of Polish immigrants: Milwaukee, Northcentral and Southeastern Wisconsin, Chicago, Northern Illinois, Northwest Indiana, Metro Detroit, Greater Grand Rapids, Mid Michigan, Greater Buffalo, New York, Greater Rochester, New York, Toledo, Greater Cincinnati, Greater Cleveland, Philadelphia, Pittsburgh, Scranton/Wilkes-Barre, Northern and Central New Jersey, Central Connecticut, and Western Massachusetts. The Polish community in Buffalo has the largest Fat Thursday event outside of Poland, which is run in cooperation with the monthly Polish Happy Hour Buffalo event.

See also

 List of doughnut varieties
 List of Polish desserts

Explanatory notes

Citations

General and cited sources

External links
 Paczki Day PSA, an account of Detroit area Paczki Day traditions in 2008
 Paczkis Video produced by Wisconsin Public Television

Carnival foods
Cuisine of Michigan
Cuisine of the Midwestern United States
Culture of Buffalo, New York
Custard desserts
Foods with jam
Polish desserts
Polish doughnuts
Stuffed desserts
Ukrainian desserts